Adaeze Chidinma Oreh (born 19 July 1979) is a Nigerian Family physician, Public health specialist and Universal health care advocate who is currently a Senior Medical Officer at the Department of Hospital Services in Nigeria's Federal Ministry of Health. She is a 2019 Aspen Institute New Voices Fellow.

Early life and education 
Adaeze Oreh was born in Benin City, Edo State to a medical doctor father (Peter Odili) and a judicial officer mother (Mary Odili). She is the eldest of four children. 
She received her primary education at The Play Pen Child Development Centre in Port Harcourt and her secondary education in the University Demonstration Secondary School, University of Port Harcourt.
She proceeded to the college of medicine, University of Nigeria, Nsukka and graduated with a Bachelor of Medicine, Bachelor of Surgery degree in 2003.
After completing her medical degree, she commenced her internship at the Braithwaite Memorial Specialist Hospital of the Rivers State University in Port Harcourt. She proceeded to get a degree in International Health Management at the Imperial College Business School of the Imperial College London after the completion of her National Youth Service with the National Youth Service Corps. There, she majored in Global Health Systems, Healthcare Strategy, Healthcare Financing, Organizational Management, Health Informatics and Innovation.
Dr Adaeze Oreh also holds a master's degree in Public health from the London School of Hygiene & Tropical Medicine.

Career 
After the completion of her master's degree she volunteered with the Federal Ministry of Health for a period of about seven months, and then she was appointed Programme Coordinator of the Abuja Centre of the National Blood Transfusion Service - a partnership project of the United States Centers for Disease Control and Prevention (CDC) and Nigeria's Federal Ministry of Health funded under the United States President's Emergency Plan for AIDS Relief (PEPFAR). She held this position for five years between 2009 and 2014. In addition, she contributed towards the revision of the country's National Blood Policy in the National Health Act of 2014.
She is a Fellow of the West African College of Physicians and Member of National Postgraduate Medical College of Nigeria in Family Medicine and is certified in Leadership and Management in addition to Safety and Quality in Healthcare from Harvard T.H. Chan School of Public Health, University of Washington and University of Bath.
She is a 2019 Aspen Institute New Voices Fellow.

Personal life
Adaeze is the daughter of the former Governor of Rivers State, Dr Peter Odili, and Nigerian Supreme Court Justice, Justice Mary Odili.

She married Patrick Oreh, an electronics engineer and entrepreneur, in 2004. The couple have two children.

References 

1979 births
Living people
University of Nigeria alumni